Savelugu Municipal District is one of the sixteen districts in Northern Region, Ghana. Originally it was formerly part of the then-larger Savelugu-Nanton District in 1988, which was created from the former West Dagomba District Council, until it was elevated to municipal district assembly status in March 2012 to become Savelugu-Nanton Municipal District. However, on 15 March 2018, the southern part of the district was split off to create Nanton District on 15 March 2018; thus the remaining part has been renamed as Savelugu Municipal District. The municipality is located in the northwest part of Northern Region and has Savelugu as its capital town.

External links 
 Savelugu-Nanton Municipal District Info
 
 GhanaDistricts.com

References 

Savelugu-Nanton District
Districts of the Northern Region (Ghana)
Dagbon